William, Will, Bill or Billy Young may refer to:

Arts and entertainment
 William Young (composer) (died 1662), English composer and viola da gambist
 William Young (architect) (1843–1900), Scottish architect, designer of Glasgow City Chambers
 William Young (playwright) (1847–1920), American playwright, writer and actor
 William Young (artist) (1875–1944), Australian watercolor painter
 Billy Young (singer) (born 1941), American singer/songwriter
 William Allen Young (born 1954), African American actor
 William P. Young (born 1955), Canadian/American novelist
 Will Young (born 1979), English actor and singer/songwriter

Business and industry
 W. J. Young (William John Young, 1827–1896), American industrialist, founder of the W.J. Young Company
 William John Young (pastoralist) (1850–1931), Australian company chief executive and station manager
 Tom Young (trade unionist) (William Thomas Young, 1870–1953), New Zealand seaman and trade unionist
 William T. Young (1918–2004), American businessman
 William H. Young (labor leader) (born 1946), American labor leader, president of National Association of Letter Carriers

Military
 William Young (Royal Navy officer, born 1751) (1751–1821), British Royal Navy officer
 William Young (Royal Navy officer, born 1761) (1761–1847), British Royal Navy officer
 William Young (Medal of Honor) (1835–1878), American Civil War sailor and Medal of Honor recipient
 William Hugh Young (1838–1901), Confederate States Army brigadier general
 William Young (VC) (1876–1916), Scottish recipient of the Victoria Cross
 William Ramsay Young (1894–1965), Australian soldier
 William Young (veteran) (1900–2007), British military veteran, last surviving member of Royal Flying Corps

Politics and law

Australia
 William Young (Australian politician) (1852–1915), New South Wales politician
 William Young (Tasmanian politician) (1912–2012), Australian politician
 Bill Young (Tasmanian politician) (1917–2003), Australian politician, member of the Tasmanian House of Assembly
 Bill Young (Western Australian politician) (1918–2012), Western Australian politician

New Zealand
 Bill Young (New Zealand politician) (1913–2009), New Zealand politician
 William Young (New Zealand politician) (fl. 1950), New Zealand politician, member of the Legislative Council
 William Young (judge) (born 1952), Justice of the Supreme Court of New Zealand

UK
 Sir William Young, 1st Baronet, of North Dean (1724–1788), British politician, colonial Governor of Dominica
 Sir William Young, 2nd Baronet (1749–1815), British politician, colonial Governor of Tobago
 Sir William Young, 4th Baronet (1806–1842), British politician
 William Tanner Young (fl. 1838–1845), British diplomat
 Sir William Young, 1st Baronet, of Bailieborough Castle (died 1848), British baronet of County Cavan, Ireland
 William Robert Young (died 1933), Irish linen merchant, politician and philanthropist
 William Young (Scottish politician) (1863–1942), Scottish Member of Parliament for East Perthshire and Perth

US
 William Singleton Young (1790–1827), US Representative from Kentucky
 William Young (Wisconsin politician) (1821–1890), American politician
 William Henry Young (politician) (1845–?), American politician in Wisconsin
 William Albin Young (1860–1928), US Representative from Virginia
 Bill Young (Florida politician) (1930–2013), United States Representative from Florida
 William G. Young (born 1940), United States District Judge for the District of Massachusetts
 Bill Young (Nevada politician) (born 1956), American politician and sheriff of Clark County, Nevada

Elsewhere
 William Young (Nova Scotia politician) (1799–1887), Canadian politician, Premier of Nova Scotia
 William Mackworth Young (1840–1924), member of the Indian Civil Service and Lieutenant-Governor of the Punjab
 William Douglas Young (1859–1943), Governor of the Falkland Islands
 William Alfred Young (1863–1911), President of the Council, and Magistrate of the British Overseas Territory of Pitcairn Island

Science and medicine
 William Henry Young (1863–1942), English mathematician
 William John Young (biochemist) (1878–1942), English biochemist
 William Alexander Young (1889–1928), Scottish doctor and surgeon
 William Gould Young (1902–1980), American physical organic chemist, winner of the Priestley Medal
 William D. Young (doctor), Canadian doctor whose work was commemorated with the Dr. William D. Young Memorial fountain in Toronto

Sports

American football
 Billy Young (American football) (1901–1971), American football player for the Green Bay Packers
 Bill Young (American football lineman) (1914–1994), American NFL football player for the Washington Redskins
 Bill Young (American football coach) (1946–2021), American college football defensive coordinator

Association football (soccer)
 William Young (footballer, born 1884) (1884–1917), English footballer
 William Young (footballer, born 1892) (1892–1965), English footballer
 Billy Young (association football) (born 1938), Irish soccer player
 Bill Young (soccer) (born 1950), Canadian international soccer player

Cricket
 William Young (English cricketer) (1861–1933), English cricketer
 William Young (Scottish cricketer) (1896–1966), Scottish cricketer
 Billy Young (cricketer) (born 1970), English cricketer
 Will Young (cricketer) (born 1992), New Zealand cricketer

Australian rules football
 Bill Young (footballer, born 1886) (1886–1959), Australian rules footballer for St Kilda
 Bill Young (footballer, born 1931) (1931–2020), Australian rules footballer
 Will Young (Australian footballer) (born 1990), Australian rules footballer

Other sports
 William J. Young (coach) (1881–1957), American college basketball and football coach
 William Pennington Young (1896–1968), American Negro league baseball player
 Bill Young (cycling) (1905–1994), Australian cycling administrator
 W. B. Young (1916–2013), Scottish rugby union player
 Bill Young (ice hockey) (born 1947), Canadian ice hockey player
 Bill Young (rugby union) (born 1974), Australian rugby union footballer

Others
 William Weston Young (1776–1847), British Quaker entrepreneur, artist, and inventor
 William C. Young, (1842–1896), American minister and educator, eighth president of Centre College
 William Hooper Young (1871–?), convicted American murderer
 William Gordon Young (1904–1974), Australian physical culturist and public servant
 Bill Young (CIA officer) (1934–2011), American CIA officer largely responsible for the Laotian Civil War
 Leslie Isben Rogge (a.k.a. Bill Young, born 1940), American bank robber
 William R. Young (born 1946), Canadian civil servant

See also
 Willie Young (disambiguation)
 William Yonge (disambiguation)